Table of Glory (simplified Chinese: 乒乓圆) is a Singaporean Chinese Sports and Romance drama which was telecasted on Singapore's free-to-air channel, MediaCorp Channel 8. It made its debut on 1 April 2009 and ended on 28 April 2009. This drama serial consists of 20 episodes, and was screened on every weekday night at 9:00 pm.

Plot
Since young, He Sheng Wu (Joshua Ang) has had a passion for table tennis. His mother was a national player and she personally coached him and honed his skills as a table tennis player. However, ever since his mother's untimely death in an accident, Ah Wu became quiet and sullen and withdrew into his own shell. His performance in his studies and at work was affected and he was branded a “loser”. Ah Wu helps out at his father, He Yingxiong's (Zheng Geping) laundry shop. His only comfort is in paddling a table tennis ball against a wall.

He Yingxiong is furious that his son is seemingly useless and wasting his life away paddling a table tennis ball against an empty wall on most days. He refuses to let Ah Wu play table tennis. However, Ah Wu resists all attempts to stop him from playing table tennis and continues to do so. Even though Ah Wu does not have any actual experience playing against a real opponent, and in fact could not even beat a young child at a game of table tennis, he possesses an innate talent for reading his opponent's moves and strategy in the game. This enables him to be the dark horse in some matches, coming back from the brink of defeat to win the game.

Ah Wu is a loner and his only friend is Mai Xiaofen (Teresa Tseng) whom he grew up with. Xiaofen is one of the top female table tennis players, but ever since losing the match with Mary-Ann (Moo Yan Yee), an unknown to the table tennis world until that day, she has been teased about not winning to an unknown, and her mother, ex-national player Mai Tiantian (Kym Ng), is her coach who pushes her hard to train herself to become a top player in the sport. However, Xiaofen lacks confidence. Since she started to play competitively, her personal best has always remained at fourth placing. This led to Xiaofen being nicknamed “Fourth Sister”.

Tiantian and Yingxiong are feuding neighbours and bicker constantly whenever they run into each other. Despite this, Ah Wu and Xiaofen get along fabulously. Ah Wu is secretly in love with Xiaofen but being inarticulate, finds it difficult to express his feelings for her. To make things worse, Xiaofen admires a new player in her table tennis team, the good-looking He Jiajun (Dai Xiangyu). Xiaofen admires Jiajun's skills as a table tennis player and is also infatuated with him thus making her oblivious to Ah Wu's quiet love and concern for her.

Zhang Ziyi (Zhou Ying) is Xiaofen's trendy and cool teammate. She is an exceptionally skilled table tennis player and is billed to be the next big thing in table tennis. Jiajun is impressed and taken with Ziyi but she is indifferent to him. On the other hand, Ziyi prefers Ah Wu as she finds him sincere and looks for opportunities to spend time with Ah Wu and get to know him better.

With Ziyi's encouragement and support. Ah Wu starts to have dreams of becoming a table tennis player on the team. However, everyone ridicules him when he shared his dream and even Xiaofen tells him not to waste his time daydreaming. Ah Wu is undeterred as he loves table tennis. He tells himself that he will stop playing against an empty wall but instead, will step up to play against other table tennis players.

Ah Wu's luck turns for the better when his talent is spotted by the undisputed “King of Table Tennis”, Lin Dadi (Zhang Wen Xiang) who is determined to train Ah Wu to become a world-class player. The unorthodox training methods which Dadi uses to coach Ah Wu pay off and the table tennis fraternity sits up and takes notice of this new upstart who wins match after match, including those against veteran skilled players. Jiajun is determined to beat Ah Wu.

Jiajun and Ah Wu – two vastly different table tennis players. One is acknowledged as talented and skilled, the other as a maverick player who got lucky at matches. One who is trained and mentored by a famous coach, the other by a coach with unorthodox and unproven methods. One who is highly competitive and ambitious, the other who plays table tennis for the love of the sport. To whom will victory ultimately belong?

Cast

Supporting cast

Trivia
 The show is repeated on 3.30pm at Mediacorp Channel 8.
 Zheng Geping & Kym Ng first collaboration
 Ya Hui & Jeremy Chan first collaboration
 Joshua Ang fourth drama series
 The series was not nominated for any awards in Star Awards 2010.

Development

External links
 

Singapore Chinese dramas
2009 Singaporean television series debuts
2009 Singaporean television series endings
Channel 8 (Singapore) original programming